Project E.T. (an abbreviation of Esco Terrestrial) is a mixtape by Atlanta-based producer William "DJ Esco" Moore, hosted by American rapper Future. It was released on June 24, 2016, on DatPiff and LiveMixtapes.

Singles
"Too Much Sauce" was released as the mixtape's lead single on August 19, 2016, on iTunes.

Track listing

Sample credits
"Right Now" contains an interpolation from "No More Pain", performed by 2Pac

References

External links
Official download on DatPiff
Project E.T. Esco Terrestrial on Discogs

2016 mixtape albums
Future (rapper) albums
Albums produced by Zaytoven
Albums produced by DJ Mustard
Albums produced by Metro Boomin
Albums produced by Southside (record producer)